"Mothership" is the first single by Enter Shikari. It was released as a digital download and a very limited run of 100 CD singles. It was released in August 2006. There was no vinyl released. It was available from their online store and from iTunes. It has been featured as single of the week on the iTunes Store.

A video has been made for this single, which is viewable on the band's website. The song has since been re-recorded and was included on Enter Shikari's debut album, Take to the Skies. When performed live, a dubstep intro, known as "Motherstep," is played along with the song. A single of the "Motherstep" version of "Mothership," recorded in 2010 at the Hammersmith Apollo, was released as a single on 26 January 2011.

Track listing
Mothership single

Motherstep/Mothership single

Video
The video for "Mothership" was shot at The Underworld in Camden, London on 2 July 2006 at a live performance and was filmed by overhead cameras, angled from the ceiling.

Chart performance

Personnel
Roughton "Rou" Reynolds – lead vocals, electronics
Liam "Rory" Clewlow – guitar, backing vocals
Chris Batten – bass, backing vocals
Rob Rolfe – drums

References

2006 songs
2006 debut singles
Enter Shikari songs
Wikipedia requested audio of songs